Paraisópolis ("Paradise city", from paraiso paradise (Hisp.) and -polis city (Greek)  is a neighborhood of São Paulo city, which is part of the Vila Andrade district, in the south zone. It is located adjacent to the affluent district of Morumbi. Paraisópolis is a favela and is the largest squatted informal settlement in the city. Paraisópolis has an estimated population between 80,000 and 100,000 people. It contains about 20,000 households.

References

Favelas
Neighbourhoods in São Paulo
Squatting in Brazil